Richard Murray (1 July 1779 - 26 July 1854) was an Anglican priest, most notably  Dean of Ardagh from 1829  until his death.
 
He was born in County Tyrone and educated at Trinity College, Dublin.

References

1779 births
1854 deaths
Alumni of Trinity College Dublin
19th-century Irish Anglican priests
Deans of Ardagh